"You've Got What Gets Me" is a song composed by George Gershwin, with lyrics by Ira Gershwin, written for the 1932 film Girl Crazy.

Notable recordings 
Ella Fitzgerald - Ella Fitzgerald Sings the George and Ira Gershwin Songbook (1959) (first recording)

Songs with music by George Gershwin
Songs with lyrics by Ira Gershwin
Songs from Girl Crazy
1932 songs